Liang Reng-guey or Thomas Liang (born 31 May 1950) is a Taiwanese cross-country skier. He competed at the 1972 Winter Olympics and the 1976 Winter Olympics. He also qualified for the 1980 Winter Olympics, but did not compete, as the People's Republic of China protested Taiwanese participation as the Republic of China. Liang later became a coach for other Taiwanese Olympians who were permitted to compete as Chinese Taipei.

References

External links
 

1950 births
Living people
Taiwanese male cross-country skiers
Olympic cross-country skiers of Taiwan
Cross-country skiers at the 1972 Winter Olympics
Cross-country skiers at the 1976 Winter Olympics
Place of birth missing (living people)
Skiing coaches